The Football Cup of Republika Srpska (Serbian Cyrillic: Kуп Peпубликe Cpпcкe, Serbian Latin: Kup Republike Srpske), also just known as the Republika Srpska Cup, is a secondary knockout football competition contested annually by clubs from the entity Republika Srpska, Bosnia and Herzegovina. The competition is run by the Football Association of Republika Srpska.

Cup winners

Seasons boycotting Bosnia's FA (1993–2002)

Seasons as a Secondary Cup in Bosnia (2002–present)

Performance by club

See also
Football Federation of Bosnia and Herzegovina
Football Association of Republika Srpska
Premier League of Bosnia and Herzegovina
First League of the Republika Srpska
Bosnian football league system

References

External links
Football Association of Republika Srpska 

 

  
Cup
Football cup competitions in Bosnia and Herzegovina